"Just Hold On" is a 2016 song by Steve Aoki and Louis Tomlinson.

Just Hold On may also refer to:

 "Just Hold On", a 2000 song by Toploader
 "Just Hold On", a 2020 song by Sub Focus featuring Wilkinson

See also
 Hold On (disambiguation)